Nicolás Arturo Gauna (born 3 April 1992) is an Argentine professional footballer who plays as a left winger for Primera B de Chile side Cobreloa.

Career
A product of the Boca Juniors youth system, he made his professional debut playing for Sportivo Italiano in the Primera B Metropolitana and went on his career playing for several clubs in minor categories of the Argentine football until he joined Curicó Unido in the Chilean Primera División on second half 2017. After a productive path with Deportes Puerto Montt, he joined Coquimbo Unido for the 2022 season.

For the 2023 season, he signed with Cobreloa in the Primera B de Chile.

References

External links
 
 Nicolás Gauna at PlaymakerStats.com

1992 births
Living people
Footballers from Buenos Aires
Argentine footballers
Argentine expatriate footballers
Association football forwards
Sportivo Italiano footballers
Club Atlético Ituzaingó players
Club Atlético Acassuso footballers
Club Atlético Colegiales (Argentina) players
Juventud Unida de Gualeguaychú players
Curicó Unido footballers
Puerto Montt footballers
Coquimbo Unido footballers
Cobreloa footballers
Primera C Metropolitana players
Primera B Metropolitana players
Primera Nacional players
Chilean Primera División players
Primera B de Chile players
Expatriate footballers in Chile
Argentine expatriate sportspeople in Chile
Argentine emigrants to Chile